Flushing Hospital Medical Center (also known as Flushing Hospital) is one of the oldest hospitals in New York City. It survived a 1999 bankruptcy and subsequently affiliated first with the New York Presbyterian Hospital and then with the MediSys Health Network. The hospital is also currently affiliated with the New York Institute of Technology College of Osteopathic Medicine to provide clinical rotations for the college's osteopathic medicine students.

History
Established in 1884, in 1951 the hospital celebrated the birth of its 5,000th baby.

By 1993 Flushing Hospital was described as "an unaffiliated community hospital that is struggling financially." On that basis, the hospital affiliated with Preferred Health Network, then-described as "a network of hospitals and health centers based in Brooklyn."

A voluntary hospital, Flushing's nursing staff was particularly affected in early 2012 by financial difficulties, having been listed in 2011 as being among six NYC hospitals "in critical condition" - at the time it was part of the MediSys Health Network.

The hospital's original major building, constructed in 1913, was demolished in 1975.

Affiliations

MediSys Health Network owns and operates Jamaica Hospital Medical Center and Flushing Hospital Medical Center. Its prior affiliations and management include the New York Presbyterian Healthcare Network.

Parsons Hospital became a division of Flushing. the latter was acquired by 
New York Hospital in April 1996.

References

External links
 New York Times article on Flushing Hospital and others nearby

Hospitals in Queens, New York
Flushing, Queens
Hospitals established in 1884